Henry Lisandro Ramos Allup (born 17 October 1943) is a Venezuelan politician and lawyer and former President of the National Assembly who was born in Valencia, Carabobo. He has been leader of the social democratic Democratic Action party, holding the position of Secretary-General.

In 2016, following the decisive victory of the Democratic Unity Roundtable (an electoral coalition of which Democratic Action is part) in the 2015 parliamentary election, Ramos Allup was chosen by members of the coalition to be President of the National Assembly, succeeding Diosdado Cabello.

Early life
Henry Ramos was born on 17 October 1943 in Valencia, Carabobo, son of Amanda Allup de Ramos and Emilio Ramos Rachid, both of Lebanese descent. His father was a doctor and his mother was a housewife. He has one sister, Amanda Ramos Del Nido.

Political career
Ramos Allup is a lawyer and was a member of the Legislative Council of the Carabobo State and four times deputy for Carabobo state to Congress.

He was deputy for Democratic Action party in 1984, 1989, 1994, 1998 and 2000. In the 2000 elections he was elected deputy for the Caracas district, then in sync with the decision of the alliance of opposition parties does not present his candidacy for re-election in the legislative elections of 2005, this with the intention of making known the distrust at the time was on the electoral arbiter, National Electoral Council.

In 2008 he makes his party comes to the Mesa de la Unidad Democratica, along with other parties like COPEI, Primero Justicia, Venezuela Project, Alianza Bravo Pueblo, Un Nuevo Tiempo and others.

In the parliamentary elections of 2010 Ramos Allup Venezuela elected deputy for the Democratic Unity Roundtable for the Latin American Parliament, being sworn in that office on 7 January 2011.

In August 2012 he was elected vice president of the Socialist International.

In May 2019, Supreme Tribunal of Justice ordered the prosecution of seven National Assembly members for their actions during the failed uprising, including Ramos.

Personal life
His first marriage was in Valencia and had a second marriage with Diana D'Agostino, with whom he had three children. His brother-in-law are Francisco D'Agostino and Eladio Larez.

References

 
 

1943 births
Living people
Democratic Action (Venezuela) politicians
Members of the National Assembly (Venezuela)
People from Valencia, Venezuela
People of the Crisis in Venezuela
Speakers of the National Assembly (Venezuela)
Venezuelan democracy activists
Venezuelan people of Lebanese descent
Venezuelan people of Syrian descent
Venezuelan Roman Catholics